Phragmataecia pygmaea is a species of moth of the family Cossidae. It is found in south-eastern Russia, Korea and north-eastern China (Charbin).

References

Moths described in 1888
Phragmataecia